Leonard James Miles GC (27 January 1904 – 21 September 1940) was an Air Raid Precautions warden who was posthumously awarded a George Cross for the gallantry he showed in leaving his air raid shelter to warn others of a nearby unexploded bomb in Hainault in Essex on 21 September 1940. He was by trade a building contractor.

21/22 September 1940
ARP Warden Leonard Miles was on duty on the night of 21/22 September 1940 when a Luftwaffe air raid on Ilford commenced. James observed that a parachute mine was falling near his home on Lime Grove, in Hainault, East London. Though he could have safely retreated to a public shelter, he ran towards the danger, in order to warn some people, whom he knew to be in their houses.

Miles was mortally wounded when the mine exploded, but was still conscious, but refused first aid from another warden. He instructed that a nearby fire which had been caused by a broken gas main be attended to first.

He was taken to the King George Hospital in Ilford but died about 24 hours later. He was cremated on 26 September 1940, and his ashes were scattered in the City of London Cemetery on the same day.

George Cross citation
Notice of his award appeared in The London Gazette on 17 January 1941.

Notes

References

External links
 CWGC: Leonard James Miles

British recipients of the George Cross
1940 deaths
British civilians killed in World War II
1904 births
Deaths by airstrike during World War II
Civil Defence Service personnel